Mount Falconer is a mountain,  high, surmounting Lake Fryxell on the north wall of Taylor Valley, between Mount McLennan and Commonwealth Glacier. It was named by the Western Journey Party, led by Thomas Griffith Taylor, of the British Antarctic Expedition, 1910–13.

References 

Mountains of Victoria Land
McMurdo Dry Valleys